Roni Hossen (born 10 July 2000) is a Bangladeshi cricketer. He made his List A debut for Brothers Union in the 2017–18 Dhaka Premier Division Cricket League on 13 February 2018. Prior to his List A debut, he was part of Bangladesh's squad for the 2018 Under-19 Cricket World Cup.

References

External links
 

2000 births
Living people
Bangladeshi cricketers
Brothers Union cricketers
Place of birth missing (living people)